Diatone was a division of the Japanese electronics manufacturer Mitsubishi Electric which made loudspeaker drivers and home and studio loudspeaker systems. It was founded in 1945 to manufacture monitor speakers for NHK (Japanese Broadcasting Corporation) and was closed down in 1999. The Diatone brand currently sees limited use on aftermarket car stereos and speakers manufactured by Mitsubishi Electric exclusively for the Japanese domestic market.

History
In the 1940s Mitsubishi Electric successfully developed a hard-ferrite (permanent-magnet) OP magnet and began to prepare for the commercial production of ferrite.

The Diatone speaker was developed in the fall of 1945 at Mitsubishi Electric's Ofuna Factory. It began life from the recycling of old stocks of magnets into magnetic speakers. At the time, speaker technology was not very advanced in Japan, and sales were limited to speaker products made by subcontracted manufacturers. However, since goods were in short supply after World War II, and because of strong demand and a promising future market, the company decided to go ahead with full-scale speaker development.

At the time, the company benefited from cutting-edge technical help from NHK Science & Technical Research Laboratories -- a relationship that would continue for many years. In 1947 Mitsubishi produced an adjustable resonance cone, and combined it with the OP magnet to produce the 16 cm P-62 F-type dynamic speaker (the antecedent of the P-610).

In the 1940s, practically all speaker diaphragms were constructed from plain paper pasted together into a cone shape. Mitsubishi Electric's speaker used a special single-cone paper made from a sheet of Japanese washi paper formed into a conical shape, and delivered groundbreaking performance. Though it was launched in the autumn of 1947 to high acclaim, it was in 1950 that the speaker was formally accepted as a speaker for broadcast use. It was the first step into a market dominated by foreign products. The Diatone brand trademark was registered in September 1946, and from 1947 the product came to be known as the Mitsubishi Diatone Speaker.

Products
Diatone Speaker
Diatone Radio

References

External links
Mitsubishi Electric Global website
Diatone History & hifi classics (private project, German)

Audio equipment manufacturers of Japan
Loudspeaker manufacturers
Mitsubishi Electric